"Stone Cold Gentleman" is a song performed by American contemporary R&B singer Ralph Tresvant, issued as the second single from his eponymous debut album. It originally appeared on the album under the title "Stone Cold Gentleman (Rizz's Interlude)", but the title was shortened for commercial release. The song features a rap from fellow New Edition member Bobby Brown. It peaked at number 34 on the Billboard Hot 100 in 1991.

The official music video for the song was directed by Lionel C. Martin.

Charts

Weekly charts

Year-end charts

References

External links
 
 

1990 songs
1991 singles
MCA Records singles
Music videos directed by Lionel C. Martin
Song recordings produced by Daryl Simmons
Ralph Tresvant songs
Bobby Brown songs
Songs written by L.A. Reid
Songs written by Daryl Simmons